Triscaedecia dactyloptera is a moth of the family Alucitidae, described by George Hampson in 1905. It is larger than the other described species in the genus Triscaedecia (26 mm wingspan) and has only been recorded from Sri Lanka.

References

Moths described in 1905
Alucitidae